Town Line Bridge, also known as Taylor Lenticular Truss Bridge, is a historic bridge located at Taylor in Cortland County, New York.   It was constructed in 1888 by the Berlin Iron Bridge Company of East Berlin, Connecticut.  It is an 85-foot-long single-span bridge and was built to serve wagon traffic.

The Groton Bridge Co. is also associated with the bridge.

It was listed on the National Register of Historic Places in 2008.

At the time of its NRHP listing, the bridge was believed to be one of only 13 lenticular truss bridges in New York State.

On August 24, 2018, demolition of Town Line Bridge began. By September 12, 2018, the bridge was completely torn down with no plan to replace. It is unknown who authorized the demolition as there is no documentation on the matter currently available other than a brief discussion during a Taylor town meeting held in April 2018.

References

Road bridges on the National Register of Historic Places in New York (state)
Bridges completed in 1888
Buildings and structures in Cortland County, New York
Transportation in Cortland County, New York
National Register of Historic Places in Cortland County, New York
Lenticular truss bridges in the United States
Demolished bridges in the United States
Buildings and structures demolished in 2018